Benjamin John McNair (born 25 August 1974, London) is an Australian actor, best known for his role as Malcolm Kennedy in the soap opera Neighbours which he played from 1994 to 1997 returning briefly in 2002, 2004, 2011 and 2014 with a cameo appearance in 2005 and also in 2022 as the show was coming to an end.

Early life
McNair moved to Australia with his family when he was 18 months old. He developed an interest in performing and began studies at the Australian Theatre for Young People and completed a season at the NIDA Summer School in Sydney. Prior to his role in Neighbours he appeared in several television ads as well as guest roles is television shows such as G.P. and Home and Away. He has three children.

Career
McNair left Neighbours in 1997 and travelled to the UK where he performed on stage in several Christmas pantomimes such his role as Prince Charming in Sunderland's Cinderella and at Tunbridge Wells in Snow White and the Seven Dwarfs. Since leaving Neighbours, McNair has continued acting on television and stage. He was cast as Joseph in the original The Secret Life of Us telemovie for Network Ten in Australia in 2001 and later played Joseph, the boyfriend of Deborah Mailman, during the first season of television series of the same name.

He has guest-starred in television series such as All Saints (1999), Something in the Air (2001), and Blue Heelers (2000; 2002; 2005). He also played lead roles in Marshall Law (2002); Nine Network's Stingers (2004); Last Man Standing (2005); and the children's series Wicked Science.  He co-starred in the short film Umbrella Men with Damian Walshe-Howling.

McNair continued to perform on stage, returning to England to play the role of Ferdinand in the Stafford Summer Festival's production of Shakespeare's The Tempest in 1999. He has also appeared as Matt in Broken; Darko Reeves in Blowback; Casper St Clair in Next Best Thing, and seven different characters in the black comedy The Steve Promise Story. McNair is a voice over artist who can be heard on numerous radio and television adverts. He returned to Neighbours, once again playing Malcolm for short stints in 2002 and 2004. In mid-2005 he made another return to Neighbours as part of the series' 20th anniversary episode. On 9 May 2011, it was announced that McNair would be returning to Neighbours in July 2011 for a four-month guest stint.

References

External links
 

Australian male stage actors
Australian male soap opera actors
Male actors from New South Wales
1974 births
Living people